East Hangtou is a Shanghai Metro station in the Pudong New Area of Shanghai.

The station has 4 platforms, but only the 2 outer platforms are in regular service. Express trains usually pass through the middle 2 tracks.

Exit list 
 Exit 1: Transit Hub
 Exit 2: Near Xiasha Road

References 

Railway stations in Shanghai
Line 16, Shanghai Metro
Shanghai Metro stations in Pudong
Railway stations in China opened in 2013